The Loneliest Punk is Fatlip's debut solo album. The album was recorded on Delicious Vinyl records. The name is a play on "Thelonious Monk", the famous jazz pianist.

Production of the album was handled by acclaimed hip hop producer J-Swift (who was responsible for The Pharcyde's debut album, Bizarre Ride II the Pharcyde) and producer Squeak E. Clean among others. Executive producers of the album were Mike Floss and Edy Crahp, which some have speculated to be Fatlip himself, as the name "Edy Crahp" is really just "Pharcyde" in reverse (In the song "Today's Your Day," he raps, "Edy Crahp, comin' with different shit/Edy Crahp, write it down nigga, see the reverse significance?", lending credence to this theory).

The album features guest MCs Chali 2na (of Jurassic 5) and Shock G (aka Humpty Hump).

The song "Today's Your Day (Whachagonedu?)" was featured in the seminal skateboarding film titled Yeah Right! directed by Spike Jonze for Girl Skateboards as well as the 2005 video game Blitz: The League.

The song "What's Up Fatlip?" was featured in the video game Tony Hawk's American Wasteland.

Track listing

 "Fat Leezy"
 Produced by Edy Crahp
 "Fatlip Intro"
 Beat by Edy Crahp
 "First Heat"
 Produced by Printz Board
 "The Bass Line"
 Beats by 45 King (Mark James) & Edy Crahp
 "Today's Your Day (Whachagonedu?)"
 Featuring Chali 2na (of Jurassic 5)
 Produced by Squeak E. Clean (Sam Spiegel)
 "Freestyle"
 "Joe's Turkey"
 Produced by J-Swift, Mike Floss & Edy Crahp
 "I Got The Shit"
 Beat by 45 King (Mark James)
 "Writer's Block"
 Produced by J-Swift
 "M.I.A."
 Beat by 45 King (Mark James)
 "The Story of Us"
 Produced by J-Swift
 "Cook"
 Produced by J-Swift & Mike Floss
 "Walkabout"
 Beat by Edy Crahp
 "All On Fly"
 Produced by Edy Crahp
 "Lyrical Styles"
 Produced by Edy Crahp
 "Freaky Pumps"
 Featuring Shock G (aka Humpty Hump)
 Produced by Edy Crahp & Squeak E. Clean (Sam Spiegel)
 "He's an Outsider"
 Beat by Edy Crahp
 "What's Up Fatlip?"
 Produced by Edy Crahp
 "Dreams"
 Produced by Venus Brown

Personnel

References

2005 debut albums
Delicious Vinyl albums